Bagh-e Keshmir-e Olya (also Romanized as Bāgh-e Keshmīr-e ‘Olyā; also known as Bāgh-e Keshmīr, Bāgh-e Keshmīr-e Bālā, and Bāgh Keshmīr) is a village in Bagh-e Keshmir Rural District, Salehabad County, Razavi Khorasan Province, Iran. At the 2006 census, its population was 1,041, in 241 families.

See also 

 List of cities, towns and villages in Razavi Khorasan Province

References 

Populated places in   Torbat-e Jam County